Yevheniya Dovhodko (née Nimchenko) (born 29 September 1992, in Kherson) is a Ukrainian rower.

References 
 

1992 births
Living people
Ukrainian female rowers
Sportspeople from Kherson
Rowers at the 2016 Summer Olympics
Olympic rowers of Ukraine
Universiade gold medalists for Ukraine
Universiade medalists in rowing
Medalists at the 2013 Summer Universiade
21st-century Ukrainian women